Arnold W. Richardson  (born October 2, 1928) is a Canadian curler. He played third for the "World famous Richardsons", which won four Briers and four World Curling Championships.

The team consisted of two brothers (skip Ernie and Garnet and their two cousins, Arnold and Wes.) They won the 1959, 1960, 1962 and 1963 Briers as well as their corresponding Scotch Cups (the World Championship at the time).

Arnold lives with his wife Lilian, in Moose Jaw, Saskatchewan.

External links
 
 
 Arnold Richardson – Curling Canada Stats Archive
 The Curling Richardsons - The Team
 Classic Curler: Ernie Richardson | Curling Canada

1928 births
Living people
Curlers from Saskatchewan
World curling champions
Brier champions
People from Estevan
Sportspeople from Moose Jaw
Canadian male curlers
20th-century Canadian people